Xavier Cardelús García (born 15 May 1998) is an Andorran motorcycle racer. He is son of the former motorcycle racer Xavier Cardelús Maestre.

Career

Early career
Since 2015 he competes in the FIM CEV Moto2 European Championship.

In 2017 he also competed in the Supersport World Championship for Race Department ATK#25.

Moto2 World Championship

Reale Avintia Stylobike (2018)

2018 
In  he made his Grand Prix debut as a wild card for Team Stylobike.

Marinelli Snipers Team (2018)
At the Aragon round he joined Marinelli Snipers Team, replacing Romano Fenati.

Sama Qatar Ángel Nieto Team (2019)

2019 
He signed to ride for the Ángel Nieto Team in the 2019 Moto2 World Championship with British team-mate Jake Dixon, aboard machinery using 765 cc Triumph controlled engines new to the series, and KTM chassis.

Career statistics

FIM Moto2 European Championship

Races by year
(key) (Races in bold indicate pole position) (Races in italics indicate fastest lap)

Supersport World Championship

Races by year
(key) (Races in bold indicate pole position; races in italics indicate fastest lap)

Grand Prix motorcycle racing

By season

By class

Races by year
(key) (Races in bold indicate pole position; races in italics indicate fastest lap)

References

External links
 

1998 births
Living people
People from Andorra la Vella
Moto2 World Championship riders
Supersport World Championship riders
MotoE World Cup riders